"Invest in Love" is the eighth episode of the sixth season of the American television medical drama Grey's Anatomy, and the show's 110th episode overall. Written by Stacy McKee and directed by Jessica Yu, the episode was originally broadcast on the American Broadcasting Company (ABC) in the United States on November 5, 2009. Grey's Anatomy centers around a group of young doctors, training to be seasoned professionals. In this episode, Dr. Arizona Robbins     (Jessica Capshaw) is stunned when her longtime patient's parents offer the hospital a donation of 25 million dollars. Katherine Heigl (Dr. Izzie Stevens) was absent from the episode, as she was filming the 2010 romantic comedy Life as We Know It. The original episode broadcast was ranked #3 for the night and would have 13.95 million viewers, garnered a 5.1/13 Nielsen rating/share in the 18–49 demographic.

Production
The episode was written by Stacy McKee and directed by Jessica Yu. Jenny Barak edited the music and Donald Lee Harris served as production designer. Katherine Heigl (Dr. Izzie Stevens) was absent from the episode, as she was filming the romantic comedy Life as We Know It (2010). In the episode, Alex Karev (Justin Chambers) held a baby shirtless, to medically stabilize him; McKee commented on this: "Alex’s story came from these cases I’d been reading about tiny, preemie babies where the doctors had done everything medically possible, but the babies just weren’t strong enough to rally." She also noted that the idea of the surprise party was "based on a true story, too. A true Grey’s story. It happened a few years ago, when we threw Krista Vernoff a surprise baby shower."

Reception
The episode in the United States was viewed by 13.95 million people, and garnered a 5.1/13 Nielsen rating/share in the 18-49 demographic. Entertainment Weekly Jennifer Armstrong gave a positive review of the episode, calling it an "emotional buildup", and writing overall: "Even Grey's Anatomy itself knew it had reclaimed its name with this one." Michael Pascua of The Huffington Post was also positive of the episode, saying that it "show[ed] that Grey's can be strong without having a Grey sister (or Izzie) involved." Steve Marsi of TV Fanatic also enjoyed the episode, noting that the lack of Meredith and Derek's relationship was not a problem, and enjoying Torres and Robbins', writing: "They're just a great, believable and enjoyable couple to watch on screen."

References

External links
"Invest in Love" at ABC.com

2009 American television episodes
Grey's Anatomy (season 6) episodes